Potter Brompton is a small village in the English county of North Yorkshire, on the A64 road from Malton to Scarborough. The village is situated just a few hundred yards off the Yorkshire Wolds Way National Trail and lies within the parish of Ganton. The population statistics for the village area included in those for the whole parish of Ganton. It was historically part of the East Riding of Yorkshire until 1974.

Potter Brompton is mentioned in the Domesday Book as having 29 ploughlands, but no villagers. The land originally belonged to Earl Morcar, but after the Conquest, the land was forfeited to William the Conqueror.

The village is well served by public transport; it has an hourly bus service through the day on the Yorkshire Coastliner route between Leeds, York, Malton and Scarborough.

References

External links

Villages in North Yorkshire
Ganton